The Caged Bird is a 1913 American silent short drama film, produced by the Thanhouser Company, and starring William Garwood and Marguerite Snow.

Cast
 William Garwood as The Prince
 Marguerite Snow as The Princess
 James Cruze as The King
 William Russell as The Farmer
 Emma C. Butler as The Guard of Honor

External links

1913 drama films
1913 films
Thanhouser Company films
Silent American drama films
American silent short films
American black-and-white films
1913 short films
1910s American films